The Z flag is one of the international maritime signal flags.

International maritime signal flag
In the system of international maritime signal flags, part of the International Code of Signals, the Z flag stands for the letter Z ("Zulu" in the NATO Alphabet) when used in letter-by-letter alphabetic communication. When used alone, it means "I require a tug" or, when used by fishing vessels near fishing grounds, "I am shooting nets".

The Z flag when combined with four number flags (The leading two denoting hours, the trailing two denoting minutes) indicates Z Time (also called Zulu Time), a military and maritime term for Coordinated Universal Time (UTC) (formerly called Greenwich Mean Time (GMT)). Thus this would mean 0800Z ("zero eight hundred zulu") equivalent to 08:00 UTC:      Or, more likely, the same information would be conveyed using repeat flags:      

Under yacht racing rules, display of the Z flag indicates that a particular false start rule, the 20% Penalty Rule 30.2, is in effect: a boat on the course side (OCS) – that is, over the starting line – during the minute before the start will receive a 20% scoring penalty.

In Japan

Military uses

The Z flag has special meaning in Japan (as well as in naval history generally) due to its connection with and symbolizing of the Japanese victory at the Battle of Tsushima.

At the Battle of Tsushima on May 27, 1905, Admiral Tōgō raised a Z flag on his flagship . By prearrangement, this flag flown alone meant, "The fate of the Empire rests on the outcome of this battle. Let each man do his utmost." (「皇國ノ興廢此ノ一戰ニ在リ、各員一層奮勵努力セヨ」). The Battle of Tsushima was one of the most important naval battles of history and this signal is, along with Nelson's signal "England expects that every man will do his duty" at the Battle of Trafalgar, one of the two most famous naval flag signals; the battle is of especial importance in Japanese national mythology.

The Z flag was raised on Vice-Admiral Nagumo's flagship  before the aircraft were flown off for the 1941 Attack on Pearl Harbor (called Operation Z in its planning stages), explicitly referencing Tōgō's historic victory.

John Toland, in his Pulitzer Prize-winning work The Rising Sun, maintains, though, that the Z flag was raised only briefly:

According to Toland, the Z flag was also raised on Akagi at the Battle of Midway and from the doomed flagship  of Ozawa's sacrificial Northern Force at the Battle off Cape Engaño.

According to Lieutenant Commander (later Admiral) Sadeo Chigusa, executive officer of the escorting , the D and G flags were raised aboard Akagi before the Pearl Harbor attack, as these flags together had in 1941 the same meaning as the Z flag in 1905.

According to Samuel Eliot Morison, the Z flag flown at Pearl Harbor was the actual one used at Tsushima.

From 1905 to 1945, the Z flag was used as an unofficial naval ensign. This practice was revived in 2011. Planes of the 3rd squadron of the 252nd Naval Air Group wore the Z flag on their vertical stabilizers during the Pacific War.

Other uses

During Project Z, the development of the Nissan Z-car which broke open the American market for Japanese automobile exports, project leader Yutaka Katayama used the Z flag as an inspirational symbol. During the strong yen crisis, the Nagasaki yards of Oshima Shipbuilding flew the Z flag to inspire the workers. The logo of the Japanese multinational corporation Zuken is partly based on the Z flag.

The Z flag is sometimes waved by fans at Japanese sporting events as an exhortation to victory for their favored team. It is also used as a symbol by some fringe right-wing groups in Japan.

In Greece
In the Battle of Elli against the Ottoman Navy, the Greek commander, Pavlos Kountouriotis, raised the Z flag as a signal for the independent movement of his flagship, the cruiser . Leaving the older and slower s behind, the much faster Georgios Averof manoeuvred independently and on its own "crossed the T" of the Ottoman fleet, forcing it to retreat into the Dardanelles. The emblem of the   features the Z flag in commemoration of this.

See also

Operation Z (1944)
Z (military symbol) - used in Russia in 2022

References

Flags of Japan
Historical flags
Latin-script representations
Maritime flags
Naval signals
National symbols of Japan
Nonverbal communication
Optical communications
Russo-Japanese War